4904 Makio, provisional designation , is a stony asteroid from the inner regions of the asteroid belt, approximately 8 kilometers in diameter. It was discovered by Japanese astronomers Yoshikane Mizuno and Toshimasa Furuta at Kani Observatory on 21 November 1989. It was named after Japanese astronomer Makio Akiyama.

Orbit and classification 

Makio orbits the Sun in the inner main-belt at a distance of 2.1–2.7 AU once every 3 years and 8 months (1,348 days). Its orbit has an eccentricity of 0.13 and an inclination of 10° with respect to the ecliptic.

Physical characteristics 

Makio has been characterized as a common S-type asteroid.

Rotation period 

A rotational lightcurve of Makio was obtained from photometric observations made by Julian Oey at the Australian Kingsgrove Observatory in March 2009. Lightcurve analysis gave a rotation period of  hours with a small brightness variation of 0.08 magnitude, indicative of a spheroidal shape.

Diameter and albedo 

According to the survey carried out by the NEOWISE mission of NASA's Wide-field Infrared Survey Explorer, Makio measures 7.0 kilometers in diameter and its surface has an albedo of 0.33, while the Collaborative Asteroid Lightcurve Link assumes a standard albedo for stony asteroids of 0.20 and calculates a diameter of 9.4 kilometers with an absolute magnitude of 12.5.

Naming 

This minor planet was named after Japanese astronomer Makio Akiyama (born 1950), an observer and discoverer of minor planets himself at the Susono Observatory. The official naming citation was published by the Minor Planet Center on 5 March 1996.

References

External links 
 Asteroid Lightcurve Database (LCDB), query form (info )
 Dictionary of Minor Planet Names, Google books
 Asteroids and comets rotation curves, CdR – Observatoire de Genève, Raoul Behrend
 Discovery Circumstances: Numbered Minor Planets (1)-(5000) – Minor Planet Center
 
 

 

004904
Discoveries by Yoshikane Mizuno
Discoveries by Toshimasa Furuta
Named minor planets
19891121